Callmann is a German surname. Notable people with the surname include:

Moritz Callmann Wahl (1829–1887), German writer
Rudolf Callmann (1892–1976), German American legal scholar

See also
Kallmann (disambiguation)
Kallman

German-language surnames